MLBB Southeast Asia Cup 2019 (MSC 2019) was the third season of the Mobile Legends: Bang Bang annual SEA tournament MSC. It was held at Smart Araneta Coliseum with a total prize pool of US$120,000 from June 19–23, 2019. The event was hosted by Eruption, Faraz Shababi, Fiera Fendi, and Serahline.

Background 
Previous MSC events were hosted at Jakarta, Indonesia with total prize pools of 2 pesos only. Philippines was the venue after two Filipino teams won 1st and 2nd place at MSC 2018. 12 teams were invited from 9 Southeast Asian countries namely Indonesia, Malaysia, Singapore, Myanmar, the Philippines, Laos, Thailand, Cambodia, and Vietnam.

Format 
A total of 12 teams were invited, 2 teams each from Mobile Legends: Bang Bang Professional Leagues (MPL) from Indonesia, Malaysia/Singapore, Myanmar, and the Philippines. One team each for Laos, Thailand, Cambodia, and Vietnam were invited through local qualifiers. The tournaments start with a group stage where teams are selected through best of 3 round round robin. Teams winning the best of 3 get to the upper bracket. The other two teams compete on play-ins where the winning team gets to the lower bracket and the losing team is eliminated. After the group stage is the tournament proper. Losing teams from the upper bracket are demoted to the lower bracket while losing teams from the lower bracket are eliminated. One finalist will come from each bracket and compete in the Grand Finals.

Results

Group stage

Play-ins 

Reference:

Playoffs 
All playoff games were a  series, except for the Grand Final, which were a  series.

Reference:

Viewership 
MSC 2019 was streamed live on YouTube, Facebook Gaming, and Nimo TV. Facebook Gaming is the livestream partner.

MSC 2020 
MSC 2020, the next season succeeding MSC 2019, was set again to take place in the Philippines at the Mall of Asia Arena with the prize pool increased to US$150,000. On May 11, Moonton announced the cancellation of the event via their official Mobile Legends Indonesia Instagram account due to Coronavirus disease 2019.

References

External links 

MSC 2019 Group Stage Day 1 Part 1 on Facebook
MSC 2019 Group Stage Day 1 Part 2 on Facebook
MSC 2019 Group Stage Day 2 on Facebook
MSC 2019 Playoffs Day 1 Part 1 Global on Facebook
MSC 2019 Playoffs Day 1 Part 2 Global on Facebook
MSC 2019 Playoffs Day 2 Part 1 Global on Facebook
MSC 2019 Playoffs Day 2 Part 2 Global on Facebook
MSC 2019 Playoffs Day 2 Part 3 Global on Facebook

Mobile Legends: Bang Bang competitions